The 1962 United States Senate election in Florida took place on November 6, 1962. Incumbent Democratic Senator George Smathers won re-election to a third term.

Primary elections
Primary elections were held on May 8, 1962.

Democratic primary

Candidates
Roger L. Davis, lawyer
George Smathers, incumbent U.S. Senator
Douglas Randolph Voorhees, real estate salesman

Results

Republican primary

Candidates
Emerson H. Rupert, businessman, unsuccessful candidate for Republican nomination for Governor in 1960

Results

General election

Results

See also 
 1962 United States Senate elections

References

Bibliography
 
 
 

1962
Florida
United States Senate